Oleg Korniyenko (born 28 May 1973) is a Kazakhstani-Russian football coach and a former player.

Club career
Korniyenko started off as a central defender but mostly played as a right or left back. 

He made his debut in the Russian Premier League in 1994 for Spartak Vladikavkaz.

International
He has capped for Kazakhstan 2 times.

Honours
 Russian Premier League champion: 1995
 Russian Premier League runner-up: 1996
 Kazakhstan Premier League champion: 2000

European club competitions
All with FC Alania Vladikavkaz.

 1995–96 UEFA Cup: 2 games
 1996–97 UEFA Champions League qualification: 2 games
 1996–97 UEFA Cup: 2 games
 1997–98 UEFA Cup: 3 games

References

External links

Profile at club website

1973 births
Sportspeople from Vladikavkaz
Living people
Russian footballers
Russia under-21 international footballers
Soviet footballers
Kazakhstani footballers
Kazakhstani expatriate footballers
Association football defenders
Kazakhstan international footballers
FC Spartak Vladikavkaz players
FC Shakhter Karagandy players
Kazakhstan Premier League players
Russian Premier League players
Expatriate footballers in Russia
Kazakhstani football managers
FC Zhenis Astana players